Feigenspan is a surname of German origin. Notable people with the surname include:

Christian William Feigenspan (1876–1939), American businessman
Eckehard Feigenspan (born 1935), German footballer
Mike Feigenspan (born 1995), German footballer

German-language surnames